The Northeastern Catholic District School Board (NCDSB, known as English-language Separate District School Board No. 30A prior to 1999) is a separate (Catholic) school board in the Canadian province of Ontario, with jurisdiction for the operation of schools in Cochrane and Timiskaming Districts.

Northeastern Catholic District School Board is located in Northeastern Ontario and covers a vast area. The board is responsible for providing Catholic education, and its 13 schools serve the communities of Cobalt, Cochrane, Englehart, Iroquois Falls, Kapuskasing, Kirkland Lake, Moosonee, New Liskeard, South Porcupine and Timmins.  Its head office is located in Timmins, the largest city in the district, and the site of the only high school in the board.

Elementary schools
Aileen Wright English Catholic School, Cochrane
Bishop Belleau Catholic School, Moosonee
English Catholic Central School, New Liskeard
Holy Family School, Englehart
Sacred Heart Catholic School, Kirkland Lake
Pope Francis Elementary School, Timmins
St. Anne English Catholic School, Iroquois Falls
St. Jerome School, Kirkland Lake
St. Joseph School, South Porcupine
St. Patrick Catholic School, Cobalt
St. Patrick School, Kapuskasing

Intermediate School
O'Gorman Intermediate Catholic School, Timmins

Secondary school
O'Gorman High School, Timmins

Adult Education School
ACCESS Program - Alternative and Continuing Adult Education Support Services, Timmins

See also
List of school districts in Ontario
List of high schools in Ontario

References

Roman Catholic school districts in Ontario